Billboard Hot Latin Hits is a series of compilation albums released by Rhino Records in 1998, featuring hit Latin music recordings from the 1980s and 1990s.

The 80s Vol. 1

"Tu Dama de Hierro" — Marisela 3:15
"Castígame" — Lucía Méndez 3:37
"Doce Rosas" — Lorenzo Antonio 3:52
"El Pecado" — Amanda Miguel 3:42
"Tu Carcel" — Los Bukis 3:35
"Ay Amor" — Ana Gabriel 3:23
"Lluvia" — Eddie Santiago 4:57
"No Hay Mal Que Por Bien No Venga" — José Feliciano 4:15
"Qué Te Pasa" — Yuri 3:03
"María" — Franco 4:16

The 80s Vol. 2

"Ya No" — Marisela 4:31
"Uno Entre Mil" — Mijares 3:29
"Así Fué" — Isabel Pantoja 5:28
"Cuéntame" — Lucerito 3:34
"Cómo Fuí a Enamorarme de Tí" — Los Bukis 4:33
"El Hombre Que Yo Amo" — Myriam Hernández 3:36
"Lambada" — Kaoma 3:29
"Abre las Ventanas al Amor" — Roberto Carlos 4:18
"Quién Como Tú" — Ana Gabriel 3:33
"Ni Tu Ni Ella" — Alvaro Torres 4:52

The 90s

"Para Amarnos Más" — Mijares 3:30
"Todo, Todo, Todo" — Daniela Romo 4:23
"Bailar Pegados" — Sergio Dalma 4:36
"No Lastimes Más" — Pandora 3:04
"Nada Se Compara Contigo" — Alvaro Torres 4:47
"Si Ella Supiera" — Julian 4:13
"Como la Flor" — Selena and Los Dinos 3:05
"Veleta" — Lucero 4:20
"Nunca Voy a Olvidarte" — Cristian Castro 5:06
"El Amor No Se Puede Olvidar" — Pimpinela 4:52

Latin
Latin music compilation albums
1998 compilation albums
Various artists albums